Arax may refer to:

Aras River
Arax (weekly), Armenian weekly published in Iran
ARAX (company), Ukrainian camera company